Kikuyu or Gikuyu (Gĩkũyũ) mostly refers to an ethnic group in Kenya or its associated language.
It may also refer to:
Kikuyu people, a majority ethnic group in Kenya
Kikuyu language, the language of Kikuyu people
Kikuyu, Kenya, a town in Central province in the Eastern African country 
Kikuyu Central Association, a political organisation in Kenya
Kikuyu Constituency, an electoral division in Kenya
Kikuyu grass, Pennisetum clandestinum
A fictional corporation in Walter Jon Williams' novel Hardwired

Language and nationality disambiguation pages